Beverly Miller Earle (born December 30, 1943) is a former Democratic member of the North Carolina House of Representatives, having represented the 101st district, including constituents in Mecklenburg County from 1995 to 2019. A retiree from Charlotte, North Carolina, Earle served twelve terms in the state House.

Political career
Beverly Earle is the former First Vice Chair for the North Carolina Democratic Party and was the Democratic Whip in the House.

In 2007 she announced her candidacy for Mayor of Charlotte, North Carolina.  She was defeated in the general election by incumbent Pat McCrory.

In the NC House of Representatives, she previously served as Chair of the Appropriations Subcommittee on Health and Human Services, Chair of Mental Health Reform, Vice-Chair of Health, and is a member of numerous committees, including Financial Institutions, Aging, Public Utilities, the House Select Committee on Comprehensive Rail Service Plan for NC, and the House Select Committee on Street Gang Prevention.

Earle is African-American.

Electoral history

2016

2014

2012

2010

2008

2007

2006

2004

2002

2000

References

External links
Official Legislative page at NCLeg.net

|-

Living people
1943 births
People from Greensboro, North Carolina
Politicians from Greensboro, North Carolina
People from Charlotte, North Carolina
Politicians from Charlotte, North Carolina
20th-century American politicians
21st-century American politicians
20th-century American women politicians
21st-century American women politicians
20th-century African-American women
21st-century African-American women
20th-century African-American politicians
African-American men in politics
21st-century African-American politicians
Women state legislators in North Carolina
African-American women in politics
African-American state legislators in North Carolina
Democratic Party members of the North Carolina House of Representatives